Canaima may refer to:

 Canaima National Park, Venezuela
 Canaima Airport
 Canaima (novel), a 1935 novel by Rómulo Gallegos
 Canaima (operating system), a Debian-based Linux distribution
 Canaima (spider), a genus of cellar spiders